Damage Control is a reality TV series produced by MTV. Hosted by lead vocalist of Canadian music group Simple Plan Pierre Bouvier, and directed by Sebastian Doggart, the show was a real-life version of the movie Risky Business. It first aired on MTV on March 6, 2005. The last episode was broadcast on April 24, 2005.

Premise
Each episode begins with parents telling their teenage son or daughter that they are going away for the weekend. What the teenager does not know is that their parents actually hide out with Bouvier a short distance from their home. Using secret cameras and an insider friend of the teenager, the parents and Bouvier watch the teen's every move. Parents can win money by correctly predicting the next action their child will take.

At the end of the weekend, the parents return home as promised. The teen can then win money by confessing to their parents about the events that took place. Eventually, Bouvier appears on the set to defuse the situation. He reveals what actually happened—"to do some damage control," as he says.

Production
The format was created by UK company Tiger Aspect Productions
Two eight-episode seasons were filmed before any episodes were aired.

MTV information
Damage Control'''s theme song was "Me Against the World", the fifth track from Still Not Getting Any..., the second album by Bouvier's band, Simple Plan.Damage Control was aired on MTV on Sunday nights alongside Punk'd, Pimp My Ride, and Viva La Bam''. Collectively, the four shows were known on MTV as the Sunday Stew lineup.

References

External links
 

MTV original programming
2005 American television series debuts
2005 American television series endings
2000s American reality television series
Television series by Tiger Aspect Productions